Anna Catherine of Nassau-Ottweiler (31 January 1653 – 15 February 1731) was a daughter of John Louis, Count of Nassau-Ottweiler and his wife, Countess Palatine Dorothea Catherine of Birkenfeld-Bischweiler.  She was styled "Countess of Nassau-Ottweiler".

She was born in Ottweiler, and married on 11 November 1671, at the age of 18, John Philip II, Wild- and Rhinegrave of Salm-Dhaun.  They had seven children:

 Louis Philip (born 1672)
 Sophia Dorothea (born 1674)
 Charles (born 1675)
 Philip Magnus (born 1679)
 Christian Otto (born 1680)
 Walrad (born 1686)
 Ludovica Catherine (born 1687)

She died in her native city of Ottweiler.

External links 
 Genealogical information
  Genealogische informatie

House of Nassau
Countesses of Nassau
1653 births
1731 deaths
17th-century German people
18th-century German people